Newbury Building Society is a building society based in Newbury, Berkshire in the south of England.  'The Newbury' (as it is affectionately known) was established in 1856 and is one of the oldest surviving building societies in the United Kingdom. It provides mortgages and savings products from its branches in Newbury, Hungerford, Thatcham, Abingdon, Didcot, Wokingham, Andover, Alton, Basingstoke and its newest branch opened in early 2013 in Winchester.  Assets at 31 October 2021 were £1.401bn.

Like all United Kingdom building societies, it is a mutual organisation owned by its current members. It is a member of the Building Societies Association.

References

External links

Building Societies Association

Building societies of England
Banks established in 1856
Organizations established in 1856
Companies based in Newbury, Berkshire
1856 establishments in England